Plectranthus ecklonii is a shrub from the mint family Lamiaceae, native to South Africa. The habitat includes forest or shaded situations near the coast.

References

ecklonii
Flora of South Africa
Garden plants